Kuala Tahan is a Malaysian village located at the confluence of the Tahan and Tembiling Rivers, in Jerantut District, Pahang.

Etymology
The word Kuala means "confluence" in Malay (refer Kuala Lumpur), and the Tahan River is a tributary of the Tembeling river.

Tourism

Resorts at Kuala Tahan receives visitors to Taman Negara. Other facilities include floating restaurants and campsites.

There are several accommodation options in Kuala Tahan which serve as Taman Negara's base camps. The Mutiara Taman Negara Resort is the only resort within Taman Negara National Park, located across the Tembeling river from Kuala Tahan town proper. Others within Kuala Tahan village area include Persona Resort, Rainforest Resort, Woodland Resort, Park Lodge (a bit far from the Taman Negara entrance), Durian Chalet, Teresek View Village, Liana Hostel, Agoh Chalet and Travelers Home.

Transportation
Kuala Tahan is accessible by slowboat from Kuala Tembeling, or route 1508 (Jalan Felda Padang Piol) via a local bus from Jerantut, a share taxi, or by car.

Jerantut District
Villages in Pahang